Provanna variabilis is a species of sea snail, a marine gastropod mollusk in the family Provannidae.

Description

Distribution
This marine species occurs at hydrothermal vents off the Juan de Fuca Ridge, Northeast Pacific Ocean.

References

 Warén A. & Bouchet P. (2001). Gastropoda and Monoplacophora from hydrothermal vents and seeps new taxa and records. The Veliger 44(2): 116–231

External links
 Steffen Kiel, Shell structures of selected gastropods from hydrothermal vents and seeps; Malacologia v. 46 (2004)

variabilis
Gastropods described in 1986